Phosducin-like protein is a protein that in humans is encoded by the PDCL gene.

Phosducin-like protein is a putative modulator of heterotrimeric G proteins. The protein shares extensive amino acid sequence homology with phosducin, a phosphoprotein expressed in the retina and pineal gland. Both phosducin-like protein and phosphoducin have been shown to regulate G-protein signaling by binding to the beta-gamma subunits of G proteins.

References

Further reading